Emma Hippolyte, OBE is a Saint Lucian politician and Minister for Commerce, Manufacturing, Business Development, Cooperatives and Consumer Affairs. Hippolyte serves as the representative for Soufriere-Fond St. Jacques as a Member of Parliament. Hippolyte was a member of the Saint Lucian Senate from 2007 to 2011. She won the Soufriere-Fond St. Jacques seat in the 2021 general election. She lost the Gros Islet seat in the 2016 general election.  

Hippolyte was awarded OBE in 2006 for services to the government and public service.

In 2017 she urged a probe into corned beef imported from Brazil.

Political career

Representation of Gros Islet 
Hippolyte represented Gros Islet constituency for the Saint Lucia Labour Party from 2011 to 2016. She was the Minister for Commerce, Business Development, Investment and Consumer Affairs. She won her seat in the 2011 general election.

References

External links
Emma Hippolyte's profile at the Saint Lucia Labour Party's website

Year of birth missing (living people)
Living people
Government ministers of Saint Lucia
Members of the House of Assembly of Saint Lucia
Members of the Senate of Saint Lucia
Officers of the Order of the British Empire
People from Soufrière Quarter
Saint Lucia Labour Party politicians
Women government ministers of Saint Lucia
21st-century Saint Lucian women politicians
21st-century Saint Lucian politicians